Graceville is a city in Big Stone County, Minnesota, United States. The population was 529 at the 2020 census.

History
Graceville was founded in the 1870s by a colony of Catholics and named for Thomas Langdon Grace, the second Roman Catholic Bishop of Saint Paul, Minnesota.

Geography

U.S. Route 75 and Minnesota State Highway 28 are the two major highways that run through the community. The town's main street is Studdart Avenue. The town is on the northeast corner of Toqua Lake, a recreational lake surrounded by two campgrounds, a golf course, and a shooting club.

Graceville is in a natural area called a wet prairie, which is a mix of prairie land, swamp and numerous small lakes and ponds.

Demographics

2010 census
As of the census of 2010, there were 577 people, 263 households, and 135 families residing in the city. The racial makeup of the city was 99.8% White and 0.2% Asian. Hispanic or Latino of any race were 0.7% of the population.

There were 263 households, of which 19.0% had children under the age of 18 living with them, 46.8% were married couples living together, 1.5% had a female householder with no husband present, 3.0% had a male householder with no wife present, and 48.7% were non-families. 44.5% of all households were made up of individuals, and 25.9% had someone living alone who was 65 years of age or older. The average household size was 2.01 and the average family size was 2.80.

The median age in the city was 52.2 years. 17% of residents were under the age of 18; 5.5% were between the ages of 18 and 24; 15.8% were from 25 to 44; 26.6% were from 45 to 64; and 35% were 65 years of age or older. The gender makeup of the city was 45.9% male and 54.1% female.

2000 census
At the 2000 census, there were 605 people, 257 households and 149 families residing in the city. The racial makeup of the city was 99.50% White, 0.17% Native American, 0.17% Asian, and 0.17% from two or more races. Hispanic or Latino of any race were 0.17% of the population.

There were 257 households, of which 26.8% had children under the age of 18 living with them, 51.4% were married couples living together, 5.1% had a female householder with no husband present, and 42.0% were non-families. 39.7% of all households were made up of individuals, and 22.2% had someone living alone who was 65 years of age or older. The average household size was 2.15 and the average family size was 2.92.

Age distribution was 22.3% under the age of 18, 5.1% from 18 to 24, 21.8% from 25 to 44, 18.2% from 45 to 64, and 32.6% who were 65 years of age or older. The median age was 46 years. For every 100 females, there were 80.1 males. For every 100 females age 18 and over, there were 74.7 males.

The median household income was $27,143, and the median family income was $35,385. Males had a median income of $27,031 versus $21,250 for females. The per capita income for the city was $15,451. About 3.9% of families and 8.6% of the population were below the poverty line, including 10.7% of those under age 18 and 12.1% of those age 65 or over.

Politics

Arts and culture

Toquatennial Days
In an effort to promote tourism, the Graceville Civic Group began Toquatennial Days on the first weekend of July in 1988, the 110th anniversary of the town's founding. Events included the crowning of "Miss Toquatennial" (entrants limited to women who would be seniors at the high school), a "Medallion Hunt", softball tournament, Sunday evening ice cream social and drag competition (an apparent parody of past Miss Toquatennials), two street dances (a free "kiddie" dance on Friday night, and the Graceville Volunteer Fire Department Fundraiser dance on Saturday night), and the Saturday morning "Graceville Gallop", a six-kilometer walk/run that circles Toqua Lake. The events culminated with a fireworks display at dusk on Sunday evening over Toqua Lake. Events continued to be held annually on the first weekend of July or last weekend of June until the Civic Group disbanded in 1998, but several local businesses and the Volunteer Fire Department have independently kept many of the events going every year, including the addition of a 3-on-3 basketball tournament and fire department "water fights".

Education
Graceville is part of the Clinton-Graceville-Beardsley School District (Independent School District 2888). It is an elementary and high school conglomerate consisting of rural schools in Big Stone County, which united in 1994. The school mascot is the Wolverine and the school newspaper is the "Paw Press." The high school is in Graceville and the elementary school in nearby Clinton.

Clinton-Graceville-Beardsley High School earned the Minnesota State High School League Championship in 9-man football, played at the H.H.H. Metrodome on November 13, 2012. In 2009, C-G-B High School competed in the semifinal game against Stephen-Argyle School District, losing 18–21. C-G-B sports compete in the Pheasant Conference of the Minnesota State High School League.

Notable people
 Congresswoman Madeleine Bordallo.
 Maureen Owen (born July 6, 1943, in Graceville), poet, editor, and biographer
 Birthplace of former Minnesota Twins baseball manager Tom Kelly, who guided the Twins to two World Series championships
 Irish language storyteller Éamon a Búrc (1866–1942) was a resident in the early years of settlement.
 Birthplace of Charles "Charlie" Ryan (December 19, 1915, Graceville – February 16, 2008, Spokane, Washington), who was a singer and songwriter, best known for co-writing and first recording the rockabilly hit single "Hot Rod Lincoln".
 Birthplace of Jack Conway (17 July 1887, Graceville – 11 October 1952, Pacific Palisades, California), a director, producer and actor from many films in the first half of the 20th century. His full name was Hugh Ryan Conway.
 Arthur Willard Davis (born June 6, 1942 in Graceville) was a Major League Baseball first baseman for three seasons. He played for the Cleveland Indians from 1965 to 1966 and the San Diego Padres in 1969.
 Todd Hendricks (born August 13, 1968 in Graceville) is a former professional football wide receiver, running back, and kick returner.
Charles A. Berg, farmer and politician
Robert Ernest Strand, farmer and politician

References

Further reading
 Bridget Connelly, "Forgetting Ireland; Uncovering a Family's Hidden History," Borealis Books, Minnesota Historical Society, 2003.

External links
 http://www.gracevillemn.com 
Photos of Graceville, Minnesota: Minnesota Historical Society 
Bishop Ireland's Connemara Experiment: Minnesota Historical Society

Cities in Big Stone County, Minnesota
Cities in Minnesota
Irish-American neighborhoods